Stanley Nelson Barnes (May 1, 1900 – March 5, 1990) was a noted American college football player, an assistant attorney general of the United States, and a United States circuit judge of the United States Court of Appeals for the Ninth Circuit.

Early life and college football

Born on May 1, 1900, in Baraboo, Wisconsin, Barnes played high school football at San Diego High for Clarence "Nibs" Price, who encouraged his brightest players, starting with Barnes, to follow his path to Berkeley to play for the California Golden Bears under coach Andy Smith.  Barnes was a center/tackle on California's "Wonder Teams" of 1920 and 1921. In his junior and senior seasons he played with the Bears in two consecutive Rose Bowls.

The 1920 California squad won the national championship going 9-0 outscoring its opponents 510 to 14. In one of the biggest routs in college football history, the Bears defeated St. Mary's 127–0. In the Rose Bowl, Cal defeated the Ohio State Buckeyes 28–0. California was also undefeated and untied in 1921 until the Bears tied Washington & Jefferson 0–0 on a muddy field in the Rose Bowl. During his four years at Berkeley, Barnes played on teams that won 31 lost four and tied two.

Barnes was elected to the College Football Hall of Fame in 1954 and was among the first group of inductees at the Cal Athletic Hall of Fame in 1986.

Legal career

Barnes was in the United States Naval Reserve from 1918 to 1921. He received an Artium Baccalaureus degree from the University of California, Berkeley in 1922 and a Juris Doctor from UC Berkeley School of Law in 1925. Barnes also studied at Harvard Law School. He was in private practice in San Francisco, California from 1925 to 1928, and then in Los Angeles, California until 1947. He was a lecturer at the USC Gould School of Law and Medical School from 1947 to 1952. Barnes joined the California Republican Assembly, a grassroots political organization, and rose within its ranks to become one of the GOP's power-brokers in California. His friend from Berkeley, Earl Warren, remained a confidant and Barnes was a member of Warren's inner circle through his rise to governor. For his part, Barnes became a Superior Court Judge in Los Angeles. He was Presiding Judge of the Superior Court of the State of California for the County of Los Angeles from 1947 to 1953. Barnes was an Assistant United States Attorney General in Washington, D.C. in charge of the Antitrust Division from 1953 to 1956, and co-chaired the National Committee to Study Antitrust Laws.

Federal judicial service

On March 5, 1956, Barnes was nominated by President Dwight D. Eisenhower to a seat on the United States Court of Appeals for the Ninth Circuit vacated by Judge William Edwin Orr. Barnes was confirmed by the United States Senate on March 20, 1956, and received his commission on March 21, 1956. He assumed senior status on October 31, 1970, serving in that capacity until his death on March 5, 1990. He was also President of the Federal Bar Association.

Death

Barnes died at the age of 89 in Palm Springs, California. He was buried at San Gabriel Cemetery, in San Gabriel, California.

Fraternal organization

Stanley Nelson Barnes was a dedicated, lifelong member of the Sigma Chi Fraternity.  After service to Sigma Chi as an alumnus, he served as Sigma Chi's 37th Grand Consul (International President) from 1952 - 1955.

References

Sources
 

1900 births
1990 deaths
University of California, Berkeley alumni
Harvard Law School alumni
California Republicans
California state court judges
Judges of the United States Court of Appeals for the Ninth Circuit
United States court of appeals judges appointed by Dwight D. Eisenhower
20th-century American judges
UC Berkeley School of Law alumni
California Golden Bears football players
College Football Hall of Fame inductees
People from Baraboo, Wisconsin
San Diego High School alumni